Grand Sentinel is an  pillar located west of the crest of the Sierra Nevada mountain range, in Kings Canyon National Park, in Fresno County of northern California. This landmark is situated at the northern end of the Great Western Divide, two miles west-northwest of The Sphinx, and immediately south of Kanawyers and Zumwalt Meadow. This feature's name has been officially adopted by the United States Board on Geographic Names.

Climate
According to the Köppen climate classification system, Grand Sentinel is located in an alpine climate zone. Most weather fronts originate in the Pacific Ocean, and travel east toward the Sierra Nevada mountains. As fronts approach, they are forced upward by the peaks, causing them to drop their moisture in the form of rain or snowfall onto the range (orographic lift). Precipitation runoff from the peak drains into the South Fork Kings River.

See also

 List of mountain peaks of California

References

External links
 Weather forecast: National Weather Service

Landforms of Fresno County, California
Mountains of Kings Canyon National Park
North American 2000 m summits
Mountains of Northern California
Sierra Nevada (United States)